Ballencleuch Law is a hill in the Lowther Hills range, part of the Southern Uplands of Scotland. Surrounded on most sides by tracks or roads, there are various routes to the summit, but the most frequent ascents are from Durisdeer or the Daer Reservoir.

References

Subsidiary SMC Summits

Mountains and hills of the Southern Uplands
Mountains and hills of Dumfries and Galloway
Marilyns of Scotland
Donald mountains
Grahams